, also known as Go! Princess Pretty Cure, is a 2015 Japanese magical girl anime series produced by Toei Animation, and the twelfth installment to Izumi Todo's Pretty Cure metaseries, featuring the tenth generation of Cures. It is directed by Yuta Tanaka and written by Jin Tanaka of Dragon Ball: Plan to Eradicate the Super Saiyans with character designs by Yukiko Nakatani. The series began airing on February 1, 2015, succeeding HappinessCharge PreCure! in its initial timeslot. The series' main topics are hopes and dreams with the Cures' overall motif being princesses, keys and perfumes. It was then succeeded by Witchy PreCure! on February 7, 2016.

Story
Eight years ago, a young girl named Haruka Haruno dreams of becoming a Princess like the ones in fairy tales. However, she is always being bullied by her classmates in kindergarten due to her dream. She later meets a boy named Kanata who gave her a strange charm while having her promise to never give up on her dreams. Eight years later, now 13 years of age, Haruka attends the Noble Academy boarding school while still cherishing her dreams of becoming a princess like the one from her picture books. One day, she encountered two fairy creatures from the Hope Kingdom: Pafu and Aroma, who were followed by a strange man named Close. The fairies told her that he works for Dys Dark, led by a witch named Dyspear who wants to bring despair to the world by locking dreams away in the Gate of Despair. With Haruka having no choice, the charm she had turned out to be a key and the fairies gave her a Princess Perfume, becoming one of the Hope Kingdom's chosen warriors: Cure Flora, a Pretty Cure to oppose Dys Dark. Later joined by Minami Kaido, Kirara Amanogawa and Towa Akagi; as Cure Mermaid, Cure Twinkle, and Cure Scarlet, Haruka forms the Princess Pretty Cure Team to collect Dress Up Keys needed to open the Gate of Dreams while protecting people's dreams from Dys Dark's forces.

Main characters

Go! Princess Pretty Cures
The Go! Princess Pretty Cures, who represent the Hope Kingdom are composed of four warriors: Cure Flora, Cure Mermaid, Cure Twinkle and Cure Scarlet. Chosen by their , their mission is to find the remaining ones while protecting the Gate of Dreams and everyone from Dys Dark. Each also has another form called  while in this form they can use their main attacks. They later use  to perform more powerful attacks and to enter a new Mode Elegant with Elegant Keys and Miracle Keys with Cure Scarlet using  as her main weapon to perform her own attack. They later gain more powerful attacks by using  along with Premium Dress Up Keys, later the Royal Dress Up Key to access new Mode Elegant forms.
 

The main protagonist. Haruka is a sweet, energetic, cheerful and happy-go-lucky 13-year-old Mood swinger, who is a first year student at Noble Academy. She likes stories about princesses and dreams of becoming one, and often refers to things as being . When she was young, she was often bullied about her dream of becoming a princess until she met Kanata who gave her a Dress Up Key and encouraged her to follow her dream. Her Dress Up Keys are Flora, Rose, Lily, Sakura (Cherry Blossom), Pumpkin and Royal. 
Her theme color is pink.

 

Minami is a calm and caring 14-year-old girl, and second year student at Noble Academy. Known as the "Academy Princess", she is the student council president of the academy and is admired by all of the students. Despite having a solitary appearance and a strict demeanor, she also cares for others like an older sister and wishes to become useful and helpful to others. She is also a member of the ballet club and has been afraid of ghosts since she was young. In episode 44, her dream is to become a marine veterinarian like Asuka. In the epilogue, she became a veterinarian. Her Dress Up Keys are Mermaid, Ice, Bubble, Sango (Coral) and Pumpkin. 
Her theme color is blue.

 

Also a 13-year-old girl, Kirara is Haruka's freshman classmate at Noble Academy, and a famous junior model. She is always busy when it comes to her work and is always seen in the magazines and fashion shows around the public. She pushes forward on her dream of becoming a top model that shines like the stars. Despite becoming a Pretty Cure, she initially refuses to join the team because of her busy schedule. However, she eventually joins the team after she turned down the audition and understands she mustn't give up on her dream. In the epilogue, she traveled to France and became a famous model. Her Dress Up Keys are Twinkle, Luna, Shooting Star, Ginga (Galaxy) and Pumpkin.
Her theme color is yellow.

  

Her full name being , she is Kanata's 13-year-old younger sister who has a strong admiration for her brother. When she was young, her desire to become the Grand Princess led her to be swayed by Dyspear into the Forest of Despair, where she had her memories removed and became known as Dyspear's daughter, Twilight. This in turn led to Hope Kingdom falling into despair, allowing Dyspear to revive. Serving as Dys Dark's second-in-command, Twilight was a merciless and cold-hearted girl who used black Dress Up Keys to power up the other generals, allowing them to summon more powerful Zetsuborgs, and often regarded the Cures as "fake princesses". She eventually came across the fourth Princess Perfume, which Dyspear uses with another Black Key to transform Twilight into the Pretty Cure-like . However, thanks to both the Cures' powers and Kanata's music, she is purified and returned to her original form as Towa. Towa later becomes the fourth Princess Pretty Cure, Cure Scarlet. In the epilogue, she became the current queen, succeeding her mother. Her Dress Up Keys are Scarlet, Hanabi (Fireworks), Phoenix, Sun and Pumpkin.
Her theme color is red.

The original Cure Flora before Haruka. Succeeded her as the current Cure Flora.

The original Cure Mermaid before Minami. Succeeded her as the current Cure Mermaid.

The original Cure Twinkle before Kirara. Succeeded her as the current Cure Twinkle.

Hope Kingdom

His full name being , Kanata is the crown prince of the Hope Kingdom who has a gentle, kind, and brave heart. When Dyspear attacked his homeland, he entrusts the Princess Perfumes to Pafu and Aroma to search the Pretty Cures while he protects the Dress Up Keys. But Kanata was forced to send the Dress Up Keys to Yumegahama before fleeing into the forest as Dys Dark takes over his palace, giving the last Dress Up Key to a young Haruka. Towa is revealed to be his sister. His status is unknown when he holds off Dyspear's attack before the Cures and Towa sent back to Earth. He is shown to be alive when his brooch was found by the cats before the Cures learn that he is somewhere around the Earth. After surviving Dyspear's attack, he was found by Nishikido and lost his powers and memories. In episode 39, he regained his memories of Hope Kingdom but not before he caused Haruka to have a mental breakdown.

Towa and Kanata's parents and rulers of the Hope Kingdom. They are trapped within the Gate of Desperation when the Dys Dark invade their homeland. After Close's departure, they were released by the Cures and reunited with their children.

Kanata's loyal steed.

The  are a group of magical animals who serve the Prince of the Hope Kingdom, entrusted to find the Pretty Cures and educate them to be a real Princess. Their appearances are all based on the Animal Mascots in various Fairy Tales.

A poodle-like fairy from the Hope Kingdom and Aroma’s younger sister, She came to search for the Pretty Cures. Pafu serves as the maid of the Hope Kingdom. She is very fashionable, carefree, spoiled, talkative and the most happy trying out different hairstyles and clothes. As the series progresses, she finally became a full-pledged maid after protecting a sick Towa from Dys Dark. She often ends her sentences with "pafu". Her name comes from the "Powder Puff", used for the application of face powder. Her human form resembles a short girl with a pink maid dress and pink hair.

A parakeet-like fairy from the Hope Kingdom and Pafu's older brother, Aroma serves as the butler of the Hope Kingdom. He is bright, cheerful, reliable, sweet, happy-go-lucky, sometimes nags the girls in his efforts to lead them to being true princesses and is deeply affectionate, especially towards his sister. Like his sister, he finally became a full-pledged butler after protecting a sick Towa from Dys Dark. He often ends his sentences with "roma". His name comes from "Aroma", meaning fragrant. His human form resembles a teenage boy with purple hair and wearing a butler outfit.

A Siamese cat-like fairy from the Hope Kingdom who comes out from the Lesson Pad to teach the Cures during Princess Lessons and acts as their mentor. She can transform into her human form at her own will, resembling a black haired lady with two twin tails. Her name comes from the "Chamois leather", a type of material used in leather bags.

Dys Dark
 are the main antagonists of the series, whose goal is to make peoples' dream trapped into the Gate of Despair and spread the world with despair and chaos. After taking over the Hope Kingdom, Dys Dark's forces are dispatched to Yumegahama to find the Dress Up Keys to conquer the world. While Dyspear is on recovery in the Forest of Despair, she left Lock in charge so he and Shut can fuel the gauges to gather people's despair to speed up her restoration. However, Lock's act of treason lost the Hope Kingdom's castle with a revived Dyspear creating a new palace from thorns. Dys is a short name for despair. All the generals survive after Dyspear's defeat. Close departs after fighting Cure Flora while Shut and Lock starts their new life in Yumegahama.

Leaders

The main antagonist of the series and the leader of the Dys Dark. A ruthless and cunning sorceress who hates dreams and aims to turn the world into place of despair and chaos with the power of the Dress Up Keys. Her name comes from the word "despair". She was born from the despair of the people whose dreams were not realised. She was reawakened when she lured Towa into the Forest of Despair because of her dream of becoming a Grand Princess; she manipulated and erased her memories to become Twilight, who believed to be her daughter and became Dys Dark's princess. After her battle with Towa, she returns to the Forest of Despair to recover and gives Lock a gauge to fill up despair's energy so she can return when she reach her full strength. Close uses the gauges that Lock collected to bring her back to life and resume her leadership. After the Hope Kingdom is restored, she begins to invade the Earth and attack Noble Academy. After Lock's defeat, Dyspear absorbs Close to assume her true form to easily overpower the Cures. But the Cures are able to assume Grand Princess form to purify and defeat her.

Generals
They serve as Dyspear's elite subordinates. Their names are referring to the words that sealed the door (Close) and to the words that halt something (Stop and Freeze). They have the power to trap people's dreams into the Gate of Despair to create Zetsuborgs, depending which appearance they summoned when they increased their power. Twilight can use her Dress Up Keys on them to increase their power and also power up the Zetsuborg. They can also assume their monstrous form when battling the Cures in the later part of the series.

The first member of the Dys Dark's Three Musketeers and secondary antagonist of the series. A short-tempered, strict, straight forward and stubborn punk rocker who doesn't care about people's feelings and wears a lock around his neck with purple rock star outfit. He traps people's dreams by saying, . After failing one time too many, Close is given a final chance by Dyspear to eliminate the Pretty Cures as he takes them and Yui to his Cage of Despair dimension where he assumes a monstrous crow-like form to overwhelm the girls to the brink of despair. But with Yui giving the Cures hope, they defeat Close with the Trinity Lumiere. However, Close survived, making his return to gather the despair energy from the defeated Lock, using it to completely rejuvenate Dyspear and create a new palace for their group. During the final battle, he allows Dyspear to absorb him to give her the power to battle the Cures; Close survived his leader's death and assumed a new form through her residual powers. Close proceeded to fight Cure Flora, but is defeated and takes his leave while starting to understand that dreams and despair need each other.

The second member of the Dys Dark's Three Musketeers. A narcissistic, pompous and aristocratic man who adores anything as beautiful as himself and wears a dark blue suit and a white hat with black rose and blue feather decoration. He also holds a black rose in his hand. He traps people's dreams by saying, . He shows admiration towards Twilight due to her being a pretty girl. He ends his sentences with "nomi", which is same meaning as his name. In episode 46, he battles the Cures one last time after the previous battle, assuming a monstrous lynx-like form before being defeated as Shamour gives him the scarf before he leaves after understanding the meaning of beauty. During the final battle, he assists the Cures facing both Close and Lock and confronts Lock about his true self and allows the Cures to purify him until he was beaten by Close. He along with the Noble Academy's students help the Cures along with Kuroro to battle Dyspear. Following Close's departure, he and Lock start their new life in Yumegahama.

 

A Scottish Fold-like fairy from the Hope Kingdom who is one of the Royal Fairies, shy in personality and often ending his sentences with "roro". After the Hope Kingdom fell, Kuroro fell into despair and transformed into the child-like Lock with a cool, gentle, calm and intelligent personality as shown in episode 40 when he was brainwashed with the hood. Wearing a hooded jacket with a demon's face and wings that cover his eyes, despite playing video games in spare time, Lock becomes the top member of Dys Dark's Three Musketeers. He traps peoples' dreams by saying, . Later, a weakened Dyspear leaves Lock in charge of Dys Dark while giving him the task to gather despair energy to help heal her while she retreats into the Forest of Despair to recover from her fight against Cure Scarlet. But Lock uses some of the energy he acquired to assume a teenage-like form before reaching his quota with the Dress Up Keys, only to reveal his intention to take over Dys Dark as he uses the gathered despair energy to turn the Hope Kingdom's palace into a giant Zetsuborg. The Cures retrieve back their keys and battle against him but he transforms into his toad-like dragon form to attack them but they managed to purify him with Eclat Espoir while he ends up in a coma. Reverting to Kuroro and waking up later, he resolves to help the Cures so he can return to his homeland. During the final battle, Close revives Lock and overpowers the Cures with the despair from Noble Academy's students, after they were released from the Cage of Despair, he was weakened and suffering under Dyspear's control, causing Shut to persuade him to remember his old-self before the Cures purify him. Kuroro becomes Lock again and aids the Cures against Dyspear. Following Close's departure, he became a fairy teacher while Lock starts his new life in Yumegahama along with Shut.

 and 

 Twin Dys Dark generals that serve as Close's attendants, created from seeds that Close planted. The two resemble young girls with faces covered by masks with different ears: Stop's having rabbit ears and Freeze with mouse ears. They trap people's dreams by saying . During the final battle, they assume their true vine-like forms to support Dyspear. After Dyspear's destruction, Stop and Freeze assume the forms of armored serpents to battle Cure Flora before taking their leave with Close.

The lock-themed monsters of the series. They are created when the generals trap people's dreams within the Gate of Despair, turning their dream into a nightmare which forms the core of a Zetsuborg's being. Each of the generals use their own names when they trap the victim's dream. Twilight can use the generals' locks to increase the power of the monsters summoned. Using a horn-like lock, the generals create more powerful Zetsuborgs to fuel despair's energy from people to restore Dyspear's strength. When the generals use the two green locks, it will grow a Forest of Despair that are planted by Close. Dyspear's Zetsuborgs are created by the lock based on her headdress as a clone version of herself without trapping people's dreams. When the monsters are defeated, they say "Dreaming!"; if defeated by Cure Scarlet, they say "Burning!".

Other characters

Noble Academy
Unlike the rest of the series, this academy is a boarding school with dormitory and they greet the others by saying "".

Haruka's roommate and friend at Noble Academy who dreams of becoming a children's book author. In episode 10, she discovers Haruka and her group's identities as Pretty Cures and helps them out anyway she can. She often takes care of civilians during a Dys Dark attack. In the epilogue, she published the Princess story.

The dorm supervisor of the academy. She was initially afraid of dogs, causing her to dislike Pafu, but became fond of her when she protected her from a Zetsuborg. Her dream is to be a judge.

The student council vice-president of the academy and her dream is to be a baseball player.

The student council secretary of the academy and her dream is to be a Japanese dancer.

The head of the women's dormitory and matron of the academy. She often appears abruptly and at the perfect moments, doing various duties around the academy. Rumors say that she is more than one person.

Haruka's classmate who often picked on her when they were in kindergarten together. He later became a passionate member of the tennis club.

The second student council vice-president of the academy and the leader of the men's dormitory.

The second student council secretary of the academy.

The friendly and polite headmistress of Noble Academy and former famous children's author who wrote "Princess of Flowers", the book that inspired Haruka's dream.

Haruka's classmate and member of flower arrangement club.

 /  / 

Yuki Aihara's fanclub, they always support Yuki for his matches and they were jealous of Haruka when she and Yuki interacted with each other.

Minami's fiance and childhood friend. In the finale, he enrolls in Noble Academy.

Haruka and Yui's classmate, he played Romeo in the drama show.

Haruka and Yui's classmate, she's the drama club director and dreams of becoming a movie director.

Haruka's homeroom teacher in Noble Academy.

Family members

Haruka's father. He is a baker, and impressed many of Haruka's friends with his baked goods on his visit to the school.

Haruka's mother. She owns a traditional sweets shop called Haruya.

Haruka's younger sister. A first grade student who acted impolite towards people when visiting the school. It is later revealed that she was only upset and missed her older sister.

Minami’s father.

Minami's mother.

Minami's older brother, who owns and manages a seaside resort, he's the heir of the Kaido family who graduated from academy before his younger sister enrolled. He dreams of becoming helpful and respectful towards other peoples.

Kirara's mother. A supermodel who inspired her daughter to be like her.

Kirara's father. A famous movie actor who has been in Hollywood films.

Others

A famous and somewhat eccentric fashion designer.

A budding starlet with dreams of becoming a TV star, and occasional rival of fellow idol Kirara. Despite her youthful appearance, Ranko is a third-year at Noble Academy.

Kirara's president and manager of modeling agency.

Minami's violin instructor, who also works as a violin repair man. He has built many violins, and gifted Haruka one.

An old butler who shows Aroma that what's important for a butler is to consider his master's feelings.

A little wild dolphin who saved Minami several years ago. In episode 16, it also saved her from Zetsuborg's attack.

A famous marine biologist and veterinarian.

A model who befriends Kirara and serves as her assistant.

Movie characters

Princess of Night Kingdom.

Ruler of Night Kingdom.

Princess of the Pumpkin Kingdom.

One of the two main antagonists of the film and the Dys Dark general who carries a white book that captures objects. He locks Pumpululu and manipulates her parents to make them forget about her. He plans to capture the Cures as his collection and reveal his intention and assume his salamandar form and overpower the Cures. With Pumpululu's encouragement, they manage to defeat him with Halloween Eclair.

One of the two main antagonists of the film. He invaded Night Kingdom to turn the sky into night. The Cures distract him so can allow Refi to place the Miracle Light on top of his palace and banish him from the Night Kingdom.

Rulers of Pumpkin Kingdom and Pumplulu's parents.

,  and 

Pumpkin Kingdom's fairies.

Production
Go! Princess PreCure was first trademarked by Toei back on October 7, 2014 by the Japan Patent Office to be used in a variety of goods and merchandise and became public later that month. On November 28, 2014, the series's official teaser site opens with a confirmed release date. Later on December 16, the Pretty Cure Store in Osaka, Japan teased the possible character designs of the main heroines, which was revealed on December 26, 2014. The names of the main Cures were revealed in the event as Cure Flora, Cure Mermaid and Cure Twinkle as well as more official information in the event.

The official website of the anime is also updated with the same information about the cast. The dormitory setting of the series is a first in the Pretty Cure franchise, that depicts the excitement of dorm life, coming of age while living with friends, and the anticipation and anxiety of a new life among roommates, separated from family.

To promote the anime, trailers were shown during the final four episodes of HappinessCharge PreCure!, featuring the transformation scenes of the main Cures. Cure Flora made an appearance at the end of the last episode along with Cure Lovely by doing a baton touch.

Media

Anime

Go! Princess PreCure began airing on all ANN television stations on February 1, 2015, succeeding HappinessCharge PreCure! in its initial timeslot along with the Broadcasting System of San-in airing on February 7, 2015.

Film
The main characters appeared in the movie Pretty Cure All Stars: Carnival of Spring♪, released on March 14, 2015. A three-part feature film, was released on October 31, 2015. The film consists of a cel-animated short, titled , and two fully CG animated shorts, titled  and  respectively. The film's theme song is titled "Kira Kira" by Every Little Thing while the ending theme is the same as the anime's second ending.

Music
The opening theme is titled Miracle Go! Princess PreCure by Karin Isobe while the first ending is titled Dreaming ☆ Princess PreCure (1-25) and the second ending is Dreams are the Path to the Future (26-50) by Rie Kitagawa. The opening theme is composed by Ryo Watanabe, the first ending theme is by Sayaka Yamamoto, the second ending theme is by Rei Ishizuka, and the background music is by Hiroshi Takaki, who previously composed the music for DokiDoki! PreCure and HappinessCharge PreCure!. The single was released on March 5, 2015 by Marvelous! featuring the theme songs. The first official soundtrack of the series, titled Precure Sound Engage!! was released on May 27, 2015 along with the first vocal album on July 15, 2015 with the title Strongly, Gently, Beautifully. The single for the second ending theme was released on October 7, 2015. The second vocal album was released on November 11, 2015 with the title For My Dream along with the movie's official soundtrack. A second official soundtrack was released on November 18, 2015 with the title Precure Sound Blaze!!. On January 13, 2016, a vocal best album was released.

Manga
Like the series before it, a manga adaptation by Futago Kamikita began serialization in Kodansha's Nakayoshi magazine from its March 2015 issue. The first Tankōbon volume was released on August 6, 2015 and the second was released on February 5, 2016.

Video game
A video game titled  was released by Bandai Namco Entertainment for the Nintendo 3DS on July 30, 2015.

Merchandise
Merchandise for the series is released by Bandai during its run including watches, bags, transformation items and more.

References

External links
  Official Website
  Official ABC Website
 

2015 anime television series debuts
2016 Japanese television series endings
2016 comics endings
Magical girl anime and manga
Pretty Cure
Toei Animation television
TV Asahi original programming
Fictional princesses
Television series about princesses